The Mahindra XUV500 is a compact crossover SUV produced by the Indian automobile manufacturer Mahindra & Mahindra. The XUV500 was designed and developed at Mahindra's design and vehicle build center in Nashik and Chennai and is manufactured in Mahindra's Chakan & Nashik plant, India. During its development, the car was code-named 'W201'. It is the first monocoque chassis-based vehicle the company has produced. It is succeeded by the XUV700, which was planned to be the second-generation XUV500 during development.

History

Pre facelift (2011-2015)

The XUV500 was launched in 2 variants in 2011, sharing the same engine: the W6 in two-wheel drive only. The W6 includes a 6-inch monochrome infotainment display, two airbags, ABS with electronic brake-force distribution (EBD), and disc brakes on all wheels.
The W8 which can be specified in two or four-wheel drive. The W8 adds GPS navigation, six airbags, a touch screen, electronic stability program (ESP) with rollover mitigation, Hill Hold and Hill Descent control, alloy wheels, and leather upholstery.
The company later added a W4 base variant in 2013.

First facelift (2015)
The XUV500 was facelifted in May 2015. After the facelift, the top-end W10 variant was launched. Automatic transmission was announced to be implemented on the W6, W8 and W10 variants in November 2015, being available on December 5, 2015.

Second facelift (2018)
On April 18, 2018, another facelifted version of Mahindra XUV500 was released. It was released with a more powerful engine and a horsepower increase of 15 hp.

Mahindra also changed the naming system of the variants. There were W5, W7, W9, W11 variants. Instead of even numbers, Mahindra used odd numbers, to denote the step up from the earlier variants.

In the second facelift, there were minor styling tweaks, and feature updates.

Exports

Mahindra announced that the SUV would be exported to Australia, Chile, Italy, Nepal, New Zealand, Peru, South Africa, and Spain as a complete knock-down.

In the South African market, sales of the XUV500 exceeded 1,200 units by February 2013.

Motorsports
The Mahindra XUV500 secured first place in the 2014 Desert Storm Rally and clocked the fastest time in three sections of the rally.

References

External links

 
Mahindra XUV500

XUV500
Compact sport utility vehicles
Crossover sport utility vehicles
Front-wheel-drive vehicles
All-wheel-drive vehicles
Cars introduced in 2011
2010s cars
2020s cars